Lokey Peak is a small, sharp peak, or nunatak, standing at the southeastern extremity of the Guthridge Nunataks, in the Gutenko Mountains of central Palmer Land, Antarctica. It was mapped by the United States Geological Survey in 1974, and was named by the Advisory Committee on Antarctic Names for William M. Lokey, Station Manager at Palmer Station, 1975. He had previously wintered at McMurdo Station in 1970 and 1974.

References

Mountains of Palmer Land